Ballajura Community College  is a public co-educational high day school, located on Illawarra Crescent in the suburb of ,  north of Perth, Western Australia. Established in 1995, the school caters for students from Year 7 to Year 12.

History
Ballajura Community College started operating in 1995, with an initial enrolment of 650 students.

See also

List of schools in the Perth metropolitan area

References

Public high schools in Perth, Western Australia
1995 establishments in Australia
Educational institutions established in 1995